The 1882 Atlantic hurricane season ran through the summer and early fall of 1882. This is the period of each year when most tropical cyclones form in the Atlantic basin. In the 1882 Atlantic season there were two tropical storms, two Category 1 hurricanes, and two major hurricanes (Category 3+). However, in the absence of modern satellite and other remote-sensing technologies, only storms that affected populated land areas or encountered ships at sea were recorded, so the actual total could be higher. An undercount bias of zero to six tropical cyclones per year between 1851 and 1885 and zero to four per year between 1886 and 1910 has been estimated. Of the known 1882 cyclones, Hurricane One and Hurricane Five were both first documented in 1996 by Jose Fernandez-Partagas and Henry Diaz, while Tropical Storm Three was first recognised in 1997. Partagas and Diaz also proposed large changes to the known track of Hurricane Two while further re-analysis, in 2000, led to the peak strengths of both Hurricane Two and Hurricane Six being increased. In 2011 the third storm of the year was downgraded from a hurricane to a tropical storm.



Season summary 
The Atlantic hurricane database (HURDAT) recognizes six tropical cyclones for the 1882 season. In the 1882 Atlantic season there were two tropical storms, two Category 1 hurricanes, and two major hurricanes. Hurricane One is known, from ship reports, to have been active in the north Atlantic on August 24 and 25. Early in September, Hurricane Two impacted Cuba, Florida, Georgia and both South and North Carolina. The storm caused flooding and damaged property but is not known to have caused any loss of life. Tropical Storm Three formed in the Gulf of Mexico and made landfall near the Texas/Louisiana border on September 15. Tropical Storm Four formed north of the Bahamas and caused extensive flooding from North Carolina to Massachusetts. It eventually dissipated near Long Island on September 23. A tropical storm developed into a hurricane on September 25 but Hurricane Five remained at sea and did not make landfall. As a Category 4 hurricane, Hurricane Six was the strongest storm of 1882. The storm hit Cuba at that intensity but quickly weakened over the island and hit Florida as a tropical storm. The storm caused some considerable damage in Florida before moving out to sea. It dissipated on October 15.

Timeline

Systems

Hurricane One 

Based on reports from two ships, the 'Case' and 'Ida', a hurricane was active on August 24 in the North Atlantic. Its prior track is unknown, but the storm continued to the north-northeast. It was last seen on the 25th to the southeast of Newfoundland.

Hurricane Two 

The Pensacola Hurricane of 1882

A tropical storm was first seen to the north of the Mona Passage on September 2. It moved to the west-northwest, reaching winds of 100 mph (160 km/h) before hitting Cuba. It crossed the island, and turned north in the Gulf of Mexico. The hurricane peaked at 125 mph (205 km/h) before hitting near Pensacola, Florida on September 10. It accelerated over the southeastern United States, crossing central Georgia, the western area of South Carolina and entered North Carolina on September 11. Continuing northward the storm moved offshore at Chesapeake Bay and after reaching the Atlantic Ocean, became extratropical near Nova Scotia. At Pensacola, the hurricane damaged crops, shipping and buildings. In Louisiana, half of the rice crop in Plaquemines Parish was destroyed by flooding. Flooding also occurred at Quarantine, Louisiana. It caused a landslide, and property damage throughout North Carolina but no deaths were reported.

Tropical Storm Three 

A tropical storm was first observed in the Gulf of Mexico on September 14. Its prior track is unknown, but it moved to the west-northwest, and hit land at the mouth of the Sabine River
near the Texas/Louisiana border on September 15. Port Eads, Louisiana recorded winds of 70 mph and a pressure of 29.38 inches. The storm brought a  storm surge to Sabine Pass, causing moderate damage, and injured one person.

Tropical Storm Four 

A tropical storm formed north of the Bahamas on September 21. It moved north into North Carolina, landfalling near Cape Lookout. Near Wares Wharf on the Lower Rappahannock four mills were destroyed. Extensive flooding was reported from North Carolina to Massachusetts. In North Carolina bridges were swept away and railroads badly damaged. The storm moved over the mid-Atlantic coast, bringing heavy rain to Washington D.C. and eleven inches of rain to Philadelphia. The storm passed into Chesapeake Bay before moving out to sea on September 23. It dissipated on the 24th near Long Island.

Hurricane Five 

On September 24, a tropical storm was first seen off the coast of South Carolina. It moved to the northeast, and reached hurricane strength the next day. The hurricane turned to the east-northeast, and was last seen on September 28 to the southeast of Newfoundland.

Hurricane Six 

The Cuba Hurricane of 1882 On October 5, a tropical storm formed in the western Caribbean Sea. It drifted northward, and as it approached the coast of Cuba, it rapidly intensified to a 140 mph (230 km/h) major hurricane. It weakened greatly over the island, never recovering while moving northward over the Gulf of Mexico. It made landfall on Florida as a tropical storm with maximum wind speeds of 44 mph at Jacksonville and 56 mph at Cedar Key
. The storm caused considerable damage in North Florida to telegraph lines, wharves and small boats. It crossed Florida and went out to sea, dissipating on October 15. Its remnants brought heavy rain to Labrador, and left 140 fatalities in its path.

See also 

 Atlantic hurricane season
 Tropical cyclone observation
 Atlantic hurricane reanalysis project

References

External links 
 1882 Monthly Weather Review

 
 
Articles which contain graphical timelines
1882 natural disasters